Blair is a station on Ottawa's transitway and O-Train located at Blair Road and Regional Road 174. It is a major transfer point for commuters within urban Gloucester and Orléans.

Location

This station is adjacent to the Gloucester Centre shopping complex, and nearby the Scotiabank Theatre Ottawa mega-movie theatre, a small bank, and other major retail stores. Shoppers City East located across Blair Road contains also several other major stores such as Canadian Tire. A long pedestrian overpass for the Queensway provides access to office complexes, a small park and ride parking lot, and the Pineview residential area.

Transitway

Prior to the construction of the Confederation Line, this was the last station in the grade separated eastern leg of the transitway; after this point, buses used exclusive shoulder lanes on the Queensway beyond this point towards Orleans. 

The main Transitway platforms closed down prior to Confederation Line construction as of 28 June 2015. The platforms reopened on September 14, 2019, when Confederation Line service began.

Confederation Line

Blair station is the eastern terminus of the Confederation Line of the O-Train. It is an elevated island platform station, with both platform faces being used by terminating and departing trains. 

The overpass of the previous Transitway station, located above the platforms at the concourse level of the station, was retained as part of the new O-Train station. 

The station offers transfer to Transitway buses within the fare-paid zone—i.e. without needing to present proof of payment to transfer between buses and the station. The bus terminal is located on the ground level of the station. 

The station's artwork, entitled Lightscape, is by cj fleury and Catherine Widgery. It is a series of suspended installations featuring brightly coloured elements that catch the light.

Service

The following routes serve Blair station as of December 2020:. Route 15 is temporarily designated as a frequent route due to more frequency and service from Route 12 being truncated west of St. Laurent Boulevard for construction on Montreal. When Route 12 service is restored west of St. Laurent Boulevard, Route 15 will go back to being a peak period only Local Limited Service route potentially restoring mid-day service between Parliament Station and the Museum of Civilization in Gatineau.

References

External links

Confederation Line stations
1989 establishments in Ontario
2019 establishments in Ontario
Railway stations in Canada opened in 2019
Transitway (Ottawa) stations